Celebrity Big Brother 11 was the eleventh series of the British reality television series Celebrity Big Brother. It launched on 3 January 2013, and aired on Channel 5 and 5* for 23 days concluding on 25 January 2013. The series is part of a new two-year contract signed by Channel 5 with Endemol to air the show until 2014.

The series was won by Rylan Clark, with Heidi Montag and Spencer Pratt as runners-up. It was the fourth celebrity series to air on Channel 5 and the sixth series of Big Brother to air on the broadcaster since they acquired the show. With an average of 2.8 million, this was the highest rated series of the show (alongside Celebrity Big Brother 8) since its move to Channel 5, until it was surpassed by Celebrity Big Brother 13 in January 2014. It was also the last series of Big Brother to be presented by Brian Dowling, who was replaced by Emma Willis from the fourteenth regular series onwards.

In 2017, Heidi and Spencer returned to the house for Celebrity Big Brother 19 as All-Stars, representing this series. They were the eighth housemates to be evicted.

Pre-series

Logo
The official new eye logo for Celebrity Big Brother 11 was introduced on 30 November 2012. The new logo design follows the same pattern as for Big Brother 13 and Celebrity Big Brother 10, but with a new winter theme.

House
The official pictures of the Celebrity Big Brother 11 House, which features a winter theme, were released on 27 December 2012. The House features the same layout as the previous layout, with minor changes. The garden, again, has a pool and a hot tub.

Sponsorship
This series is sponsored by beds retailer Dreams, who previously sponsored the sixth and seventh series.
Many of the decorative items and furniture are from very.co.uk. The show features product placement from Aquafresh, Maximuscle, L'Oréal and Lucozade.

Housemates

Claire Richards
Claire Richards (born 17 August 1977) is an English singer-songwriter and dancer, who is widely known around the UK for being the lead singer of the 90's pop group, Steps. The five-piece band formed back in 1997, before Richards and bandmate, Ian "H" Watkins quit the band in 2001. They later reformed in May 2011, releasing their fourth studio album and a documentary. On Day 1, she was accepted to live in the main house,         beating Neil "Razor" Ruddock. On Day 23, she became the second celebrity to be evicted on the final night, finishing in fourth place.

Frankie Dettori
Lanfranco "Frankie" Dettori, MBE (born 15 December 1970) is an Italian horse racing jockey. Dettori has been Champion Jockey on three occasions and has ridden the winners of more than 520 group races. On Day 1, he became the first celebrity to enter the house and to which he and fellow housemate, Rylan Clark were set a task by Big Brother to watch each celebrities VT's and decide which celebrities should live in the main luxury house or the basement. On Day 3, he was nominated for eviction by his fellow basement housemates, before returning to the luxury house. On Day 21, two days before the final, Frankie became the fifth person evicted from the house in a double eviction, alongside Tricia Penrose.

Gillian Taylforth
Gillian Taylforth (born 14 August 1955) is an English actress, most notable for her portrayal as Kathy Beale in the BBC soap-opera, EastEnders from 1985 to 2000. Her other acting roles include starring as Jackie Pascoe-Webb in Footballer's Wives and Sgt. Nikki Wright in The Bill. On Day 1, Taylforth was accepted into the main house, beating Ryan Moloney. On Day 16, Taylforth had received the fewest votes and was evicted. She exited the house via the diary room due to heavy snow in the main entrance.

Heidi Montag and Spencer Pratt
Heidi Montag (born 15 September 1986) and Spencer Pratt (born 14 August 1983), known collectively as "Speidi", are an American reality television couple based from Los Angeles, California. They are best known for starring in the MTV reality series The Hills from 2006 to 2010. On Day 1, they were sent to the basement by Dettori and Clark, and acted as one housemate. On Day 7, after Paula's eviction, Big Brother set Heidi and Spencer a secret task, which was to stage a walkout in front of their fellow housemates but unbeknownst to them, they were actually in a revamped basement, watching the other celebrities in the main house. On Day 9, the couple re-entered the house. On both occasions in which they were eligible to be nominated, Heidi and Spencer have received a vote from each housemate, enough to receive the most nominations of all the series of Celebrity Big Brother. On Day 23, they were placed as runners-up of the competition, despite their hatred and disliking reputation during the process of the competition. Both of them later returned to compete in Celebrity Big Brother 19 as an "All star" housemate.

Lacey Banghard
Lacey Banghard (born 28 April 1992) is an English glamour model and The Suns Page 3 girl, from Bedfordshire, England. On Day 1, Banghard was accepted into the main house, beating actor Sam Robertson. On Day 14, she became the third celebrity to be evicted from the house, losing to Claire, Rylan and Heidi and Spencer.

Paula Hamilton
Paula Hamilton  (born 23 January 1958) is an English model, best known for her appearance in the classic 1987 Mk II Volkswagen Golf TV advert, Changes. In 2006, she returned to the public eye as a judge on Sky Living's Britain's Next Top Model, for two cycles. During her career, she has featured in music videos, appeared in feature films, been addicted to drugs and had lost her two front teeth, whilst in drink driving accident back in November 2012. On Day 1, Hamilton was sent to the basement, losing to actress Tricia Penrose. In the early hours of Day 2, Hamilton fell ill and a doctor suggested that she move from the basement to the main house. She received the fewest votes and was the first celebrity to be evicted from the house on Day 7, losing to Heidi and Spencer and Frankie. On Day 20, she made a return to the house as part of the housemate's shopping task.

Razor Ruddock
Neil "Razor" Ruddock (born 9 May 1968) is an English former professional footballer, actor and television personality. On Day 1, he was sent to the basement, after losing to Claire Richards. It was reported that Ruddock was a last-minute replacement for comedian Jim Davidson, who pulled out of appearing in the show after being arrested by police investigating the Jimmy Savile sex abuse scandal. He was the first person to be eliminated on Day 23, finishing in fifth place.

Ryan Moloney
Ryan Moloney (born 24 November 1979) is an Australian actor, best known for his portrayal as Jarrod "Toadfish" Rebecchi in the Australian-based soap opera, Neighbours, since 1995. On Day 1, he was sent to the basement, after losing to Gillian Taylforth. He was the third to be evicted on Day 23, finishing in third place.

Rylan Clark

Ross Richard "Rylan" Clark (born 25 October 1988) is an actor, model, TV presenter and singer from Corringham, Essex, best known as a contestant on the ninth series of The X Factor. He reached to the quarter-finals before being eliminated and was mentored by former Pussycat Doll lead singer, Nicole Scherzinger. As an actor, he revealed he was Ron Weasley's body double in the Harry Potter film series and had a minor role in the film, Love Actually. He appeared in several boyband tributes for Take That and Westlife, before his audition at The X Factor. It had been reported that Clark left the house on Sundays (days 3, 10 and 17) to rehearse for The X Factor 2013 live tour, which led to media speculation. On Day 1, he and Frankie Dettori were set a secret task by Big Brother to watch each celebrities VT's and judge whether they should live in the main luxury house or the dreaded basement. On Day 23, Clark emerged as the winner of Celebrity Big Brother 11, beating fellow housemates and runners-up, Heidi and Spencer. Shortly after his Big Brother victory, he became the new presenter for its spin-off show, Big Brother's Bit on The Side.

Sam Robertson
Samuel "Sam" Robertson (born 11 October 1985) is a Scottish actor, best known for his acting role as Flynn Spencer in the E4 comedy-drama Beaver Falls. Before starring in Beaver Falls, he had made an appearance as Adam Barlow in the ITV soap opera, Coronation Street. On Day 1, he was sent to the basement, after Frankie Dettori and Rylan Clark chose model Lacey Banghard over him to enter the main house. He received the fewest votes and was evicted from the house on Day 9, losing to Ryan Moloney.

Tricia Penrose
Patricia "Tricia" Penrose (born 9 April 1970) is an English actress and singer, best known for her acting role as Gina Ward in ITV's longest-running drama Heartbeat, from 1993 to 2010. She has also appeared in shows such as The Royal and Coronation Street. On Day 1, Tricia was accepted into the main house, beating model Paula Hamilton. On Day 21, she became the sixth person to be evicted from the house, missing out on a place in the final, along with Frankie Dettori. Penrose is also a close friend of Celebrity Big Brother 9 winner, Denise Welch.

Summary
A summary of what happened by day is provided below.

The Basement
On launch night, Big Brother announced that half of the housemates will moved to the Main House or the Basement. On Day 2, the Main House housemates had to vote for one housemate to enter the basement, and that housemate had to choose another to enter the Main House from the basement. Frankie and Heidi and Spencer were chosen respectively. The twist came to an end on day 3 after Frankie was chosen to face the first eviction by his fellow housemates.

On Day 1, Frankie and Rylan decided every housemate's fate as to who would move in the Main House or the Basement.
In the early hours of Day 2, Paula was medically evacuated to the Main House after falling ill.
In the late hours of Day 2, the Main House voted to banish Frankie to the Basement. Frankie then won the power to choose his replacement, and chose Heidi and Spencer.
On Day 7, Heidi and Spencer returned to the new Luxury Basement after completing their secret mission of staging a walkout. 
On Day 9, Heidi and Spencer left the Basement and returned to the main house again. However, after several heated arguments with their fellow housemates, they moved back downstairs so they could calm down.
On Day 12, Heidi and Spencer were banished from the Basement.

Nominations table

Notes

Ratings
Official ratings are taken from BARB.

References

External links
 Official website
 Official Celebrity Big Brother Page
 

2013 in British television
2013 British television seasons
11
Channel 5 (British TV channel) reality television shows